Veterinary Parasitology is a peer-reviewed scientific journal in the discipline of veterinary parasitology. It is the official organ of the American Association of Veterinary Parasitologists, the European Veterinary Parasitology College, and the World Association for the Advancement of Veterinary Parasitology.

References

External links
 

Veterinary medicine journals
Parasitology journals
Elsevier academic journals
Publications established in 1975